Jim Cherneski (born September 12, 1974 in Baltimore, Maryland) is an American soccer player, currently player-manager for Egerton, initially alongside Jlloyd Samuel and Dean Gorré. After the death of Samuel in May 2018, and departure of Gorré to manage Suriname, he took the job outright assisted by Nathan Ellington and Emerson Boyce.

TRUSOX

Cherneski invented Trusox in 2010. They are socks that help grip a players sock to their cleat or shoe. Players that wear Trusox include: Gareth Bale, Luis Suarez, Robin van Persie, Arjen Robben, and Jerome Boateng.

Career

Youth and college
When Cherneski was nine years old he moved to Florida, where he was coached on various youth teams including the Countryside Cosmos coached by Richard Dieckman, Peter Mellor, Steve Heighway, Gordon Hill and Derek Smethurst. Cherneski was a starting defender for the Florida Class 4A state high school champions in 1991, and after a brief and ultimately unsuccessful trial at English side Brighton and Hove Albion, played college soccer at Towson University alongside Pete Medd, leading the team to a Top 15 Division 1 NCAA National Ranking and serving as captain during his senior year.

Professional
After a brief coaching stint at Towson, Cherneski subsequently played for many years in the USL, having stints with the Baltimore Bays, the Eastern Shore Sharks, the New Hampshire Phantoms, the Rhode Island Stingrays and the Worcester Kings.

After having taken several years off from football to concentrate on family issues, Cherneski received an email from a former college coach that ultimately inspired him to set up his own team in his hometown of Baltimore. Whilst in England on a college tour in 2006, Cherneski met with a representative from Crystal Palace, who were interested setting up a team somewhere else in the world. Over the course of the following year representatives from Palace flew over to America, ultimately resulting in the creation of Crystal Palace Baltimore.

Cherneski became player-manager of the team prior to its inaugural season in 2007, in which they finished fifth, and took the team to its first post-season playoff campaign in 2008, where they ultimately lost in the USL2 semi finals to the Charlotte Eagles. In addition to managing the team, Cherneski still occasionally makes playing appearances. Cherneski scored two goals in a 6–3 loss to FC Tampa Bay in the last game of Baltimore's 2010 USSFD2 regular season campaign.

Career statistics
(correct as of October 2, 2010)

References

External links

 Crystal Palace Baltimore bio

American soccer players
1974 births
Living people
Baltimore Bays (1993–1998) players
Eastern Shore Sharks players
Seacoast United Phantoms players
Rhode Island Stingrays players
USL Second Division players
USISL players
USSF Division 2 Professional League players
Crystal Palace Baltimore players
Crystal Palace Baltimore managers
Worcester Kings players
Towson Tigers men's soccer players
Association football midfielders
Soccer players from Baltimore
Association football player-managers
American expatriate soccer players
American expatriate soccer coaches
Expatriate footballers in England
Expatriate football managers in England
American expatriate sportspeople in England